Card, Cross and Jones: Criminal Law, formerly published as An Introduction to Criminal Law and as Cross and Jones' Introduction to Criminal Law, and referred to as Cross and Jones, is a book about the criminal law of England and Wales, originally written by Sir Rupert Cross and Philip Asterley Jones, and then edited by them and Richard Card. It was published by Butterworths and is now published by Oxford University Press.

This book was so popular that the second edition was published within a year of the first. It has been described as "a serious contribution to the study of the criminal law" and as an "old and trusted friend".

The First Edition was published in January 1948, the Second in January 1949, the Third in July 1953, the Fourth in April 1959, the Fifth in June 1964, the Sixth in October 1968, the Seventh in July 1972, the Eighth in May 1976, the Ninth in July 1980, the Tenth in May 1984, the Eleventh in April 1988, the Twelfth in April 1992, and the Twentieth in 2012.

References
H A Hammelmann (1949) 12 Modern Law Review 391 JSTOR
Herring, Jonathan. Times Higher Education. 26 February 2009. 
Catalogue. OUP.

External links
Google Books:
20th ed. 2012. Preview
13th ed. 1995. Snippet view
8th ed. 1976. Snippet view

Law textbooks
English criminal law
1948 non-fiction books